Wright Butler House is a historic home in Cumberland, Allegany County, Maryland, United States. It is a -story, Queen Anne-style suburban one-unit dwelling built about 1896. The house was the home of Wright Butler (1868–1932), one of Cumberland's leading architects at the turn of the 20th century. He also designed the George Truog House.

The Wright Butler House was listed on the National Register of Historic Places in 1978.

References

External links
, including undated photo, at Maryland Historical Trust

Houses on the National Register of Historic Places in Maryland
Buildings and structures in Cumberland, Maryland
Houses completed in 1896
Queen Anne architecture in Maryland
Houses in Allegany County, Maryland
National Register of Historic Places in Allegany County, Maryland